Admiral Gordon may refer to:

Charles Gordon (Royal Navy officer) (1781–1860), British Royal Navy admiral
James Gordon (Royal Navy officer) (1782–1869), British Royal Navy admiral
John E. Gordon (born 1941), U.S. Navy rear admiral 
Thomas Gordon (Royal Scots Navy officer) (c. 1658–1741), Scottish-bron Imperial Russian Navy admiral
William Gordon (Royal Navy officer, born 1705) (1705–1769), British Royal Navy rear admiral
William Gordon (Royal Navy officer, born 1784) (1784–1858), British Royal Navy vice admiral

See also
Alexander Gordon-Lennox (Royal Navy officer) (1911–1987), British Royal Navy rear admiral
Lord Frederick Gordon-Hallyburton (1799–1878), British Royal Navy admiral